Srinivasa Perumal Temple, Egmore is a Vaishnavite temple situated in Egmore neighbourhood in Chennai district of Tamil Nadu in India. It was previously called as Lakshmi Narayana Perumal Temple and hence the name Lakshmi Narayana Perumal street, where the temple is located. This temple is 600 years old. The presiding deity is Srinivasa Perumal. Goddess is Padmavathi. 'Vimanam' above the sanctum is said as 'Anantha Vimanam'.  The temple tower is of 3 tiers. Balipeedam, Dwajasthambam and Garudaazhwaar shrine are found facing the sanctum. The main deity is in the standing posture. Upper hand on the right side holds the Chakra, and on the left side, the sangu is held and on the lower hand at left side shows 'kati hasta' (rests on hip) and right side shows 'abhaya mudra'. Sages such as Visvamithra, Gowthama and Sthuthi worshipped this temple.

Location 
Located at an altitude of 33 m above the mean sea level, the geographical coordinates of this temple are: 13°04'31.8"N, 80°15'16.5"E (i.e. 13.075505°N, 80.254582°E).

Commercial complex 
On Poonamallee High road, on the land of about 42,000 sq.ft., near Kilpauk Medical College metro station, where the land belonging to this temple, a commercial complex, would be constructed to ensure a steady income for the temple. At a cost of ₹50 crore, the commercial complex would be set up.

References 

Hindu temples in Chennai